is a railway station in the city of Suzaka, Nagano, Japan, operated by the private railway operating company Nagano Electric Railway.

Lines
Murayama Station is a station on the Nagano Electric Railway Nagano Line and is 10.0 kilometers from the terminus of the line at Nagano Station.

Station layout
The station consists of one ground-level side platform serving one bi-directional track, connected to the station building by a level crossing. The station is unattended.

Adjacent stations

History
The station opened on 28 June 1926.

Passenger statistics
In fiscal 2016, the station was used by an average of 388 passengers daily (boarding passengers only).

Surrounding area

Chikuma River

See also
 List of railway stations in Japan

References

External links

 

Railway stations in Japan opened in 1926
Railway stations in Nagano Prefecture
Nagano Electric Railway
Suzaka, Nagano